Jorge Manuel Rogelio Domínguez (20 March 1945 – 24 August 2022) was an Argentine politician of the Justicialist Party. He was appointed mayor of Buenos Aires in 1994. The 1994 amendment of the Argentine Constitution changed the status of the city, turning the mayor into an elected office. He ran for the mayoral elections in 1996, and lost to the radical Fernando de la Rúa. He then served as minister of defense for president Carlos Menem to the end of his term of office in 1999.

References

|-

1945 births
2022 deaths
Mayors of Buenos Aires
Defense ministers of Argentina
Justicialist Party politicians
Politicians from Buenos Aires
Members of the Argentine Chamber of Deputies elected in Buenos Aires Province